Tianjin Crafts and Arts Professional College (TCAPC), commonly known as Tianjin Art and Design Academy, is a public tertiary education institute based in Tianjin on mainland China.

History
The College was founded in 1959 in the name of "Tianjin Art and Design Academy" and was later known as the Tianjin Crafts and Arts Vocational College.

References

1959 establishments in China
Educational institutions established in 1959
Universities and colleges in Tianjin
Art schools in China
Design schools
Art schools
Universities and colleges in China